{{Speciesbox
| name = Shore rockling
| image = Gaidropsarus mediterraneus.jpg
| image2 = Ichthyologie; ou, Histoire naturelle des poissons (Plate 165) (7064491943).jpg
| taxon = Gaidropsarus mediterraneus
| authority = (Linnaeus, 1758)
| synonyms = {{collapsible list|
Gadus mediterraneus Linnaeus, 1758 
Enchelyopus mediterraneus (Linnaeus, 1758) 
Motella mediterranea (Linnaeus, 1758) 
Onos mediterraneus (Linnaeus, 1758) 
Gadus tricirratus Brünnich, 1768 
Gaidropsarus mustellaris Rafinesque, 1810 
Gadus fuscus Risso, 181o 
Motella fusca (Risso, 1810) 
Onos fusca (Risso, 1810) 
Gadus jubatus Pallas, 1814 
Gadus argenteolus Montagu, 1818 
Merlangus communis Costa, 1844 Motella communis Costa, 1844 Onos sellai Cipria, 1938 
| synonyms_ref = 
}}}}

The shore rockling (Gaidropsarus mediterraneus) is a mottled brown, small, elongated fish. This eel-like fish has three barbels on its head, with the second dorsal fin and the anal fin running the length of most of its body. These fins may be viewed moving in a continuous wave motion.

The shore rockling is often confused with the five-bearded rockling (Ciliata mustela) and the larger three-bearded rockling (Gaidropsarus vulgaris''), due to their similar colourings, shape, and habitat. As the name suggests, the main visual differences are the five-bearded rockling having five barbels around its mouth, whereas the three-bearded rockling has a significant redness to its brown colouring when compared to the shore rockling. Shore rocklings can also be eaten, as the flesh is also very tender.
 
Shore rocklings live in rocks, feeding on both worms and crustaceans. They are distributed in the eastern Atlantic from the mid-Norwegian coast south to the Straits of Gibraltar and into the Mediterranean Sea, where it is found along the coasts of north-west Africa and southern Europe into the Black Sea.

References

External links
 
 

Gaidropsarus
Fish of Europe
Fish of the Atlantic Ocean
Fish of the Mediterranean Sea
Fish of the Black Sea
Fish of the North Sea
Fish described in 1758
Taxa named by Carl Linnaeus